Milica Denda (born 11 December 2002) is a Serbian football defender, who plays for Galatasaray in the Women's Super League in Turkey.

Club career 
Denda played for ŠF "Siniša Mihajlović" , ŽFK Vojvodina, and ŽFK Spartak Subotica in Serbia(2019–20). With ŽFK Spartak Subotica, she enjoyed Serbian Women's Super League champion title in the 2019–20 season, and took part at the 2019–20 UEFA Women's Champions League.

Galatasaray 
By December 2021, she moved to Turkey, and joined the newly established team Galatasaray S.K.

International career 

Honours 
Serbian Women's Super League
 ŽFK Spartak Subotica
 Champions (1) : 2019–20

References 

2002 births
Living people
Serbian women's footballers
Women's association football defenders
Serbia women's international footballers
Serbian expatriate sportspeople in Turkey
Expatriate women's footballers in Turkey
ŽFK Spartak Subotica players
Turkish Women's Football Super League players
Galatasaray S.K. women's football players